Farro  refers to the grains of three wheat species, which are sold dried and cooked in water until soft. It is eaten plain or is often used as an ingredient in salads, soups, and other dishes.

Definition
Farro is an ethnobotanical term for three species of hulled wheat: spelt (Triticum spelta), emmer (Triticum dicoccum), and einkorn (Triticum monococcum). Hulled wheat is wheat that cannot be threshed. In Italian cuisine, the three species are sometimes distinguished as farro grande, farro medio, and farro piccolo. In French the three species are sometimes distinguished as  grand épeautre, moyen épeautre and petit épeautre — épeautre being French for spelt.

Emmer is the most common variety of farro grown in Italy, specifically in certain mountain regions of Tuscany and Abruzzo. It is also considered to be of higher quality for cooking than the other two grains and thus is sometimes called "true" farro. Spelt is much more commonly grown in Germany, Austria and Switzerland.

Confusion about the terminology for these three wheat varieties is generated by the difficult history in the taxonomy of wheat and by colloquial and regional uses of the term farro. For example, emmer grown in the Garfagnana region of Tuscany will be colloquially known as farro. Also, some English speakers assume farro refers to steamed or boiled grain presented as salad and similar dishes rather than to the three grains themselves.
Farro is sometimes inaccurately referred to as "spelt" in English, neglecting that the term refers to all three grains – emmer, einkorn, and spelt.

Etymology
The Italian word farro derives from the presumed Latin word farrum, from Standard Latin far, farris n.: a kind of wheat (as in farina). Far, in turn, derives from the Indo-European root *bʰar-es-: (spelt),	which also gave rise to the English word barley, Albanian bar: grass,  Old Church Slavonic брашьно (brašĭno): flour, and Greek  Φήρον (phḗron): plant deity.

See also

 List of ancient dishes and foods

References 

Cereals
Italian cuisine
Wheat cultivars